Szymon Zabiełło was a Polish-Lithuanian nobleman (Polish: szlachcic) of the Topór clan (born 14 July 1750, Czerwony Dwór, Grand Duchy of Lithuania, died in 1824). He was the castellan of Minsk from 1783 to 1787, lieutenant general of the Grand Ducal Lithuanian Army, and a member of its General Staff in 1792. He was an envoy to the Grodno Sejm, a member of the Patriotic Party, the Grodno Confederation in 1793, as well as the Permanent Council, and a participant of the Kościuszko Uprising in Lithuania.

Family 
The son of Antoni Zabiełło and Zofia Niemirowicz-Szczytt, the daughter of the castellan of Mścisław, Józef Szczytt. He was the brother of Michał Zabiełło, and Józef Zabiełło, a member of the pro-Russian Targowica confederation.

French Royal army 
Zabiełło completed his education at the Lunéville military academy and served in the French army. In 1780 he became a knight of the Order of Saint Stanislaus.

Polish-Lithuanian Commonwealth 

Four-Year Sejm 
From 1788, he was a member of the Four-Year Sejm. In 1789, Zabiełło was awarded the Order of the White Eagle. In 1790, he was promoted to the rank of generał lejtnant.

1792 War 
He fought against the Russians during the Polish-Russian war of 1792, where he was commended for his actions during the ill-fated Battle of Brześć Litewski. Despite his bravery, Zabiełło was reputed to be ignorant of the finer points of commanding an army on the field against a much larger and well-trained foe.

1792 August - 1794 March 
After king Stanisław II's surrender, Zabiełło attempted to organise a guerilla campaign in the enemy's rear, but abandoned these plans due to the sheer advantage held by the Imperial Russian Army.

Zabiełło was Vawkavysk's envoy to the Grodno Sejm in 1793, where the second partition of the Polish-Lithuanian Commonwealth was ratified. He later liaised with insurrectionist allies in Vilnius, while being a member of the Permanent Council established by the Targowica confederation.

Kościuszko Uprising 
After the outbreak of the Kościuszko insurrection in Vilnius, he joined and temporarily acted as the adjutant of general Jakub Jasiński. After the collapse of the rebellion, Zabiełło withdrew from public life.

References 

18th-century Polish nobility
1750 births
1824 deaths
Polish military officers
Recipients of the Order of Saint Stanislaus (Congress Poland)
19th-century Polish nobility
18th-century Polish–Lithuanian military personnel
19th-century Polish military personnel